Corpuscle or corpuscule, meaning a "small body", is often used as a synonym for particle. It may also refer to:
 Corpuscularianism, the atomistic view that all physical objects are composed of corpuscles, which was dominant among 17th century European thinkers
 The corpuscular theory of light, developed by Isaac Newton in his Opticks, which proposed the existence of light particles which are now known as photons
 A term used by J. J. Thomson to describe particles now known to be electrons, in his plum pudding model
 A small free-floating biological cell, especially a blood cell
 A nerve ending such as Meissner's corpuscle or a Pacinian corpuscle
 A colloquial nickname for students at Corpus Christi College, Cambridge and/or Corpus Christi College, Oxford